Omoglymmius multicarinatus is a species of beetle in the subfamily Rhysodinae. It was described by R.T. Bell & J.R. Bell in 1993. It is known from the northern peninsula of Sulawesi, Indonesia.

Omoglymmius multicarinatus holotype, a female, measures  in length and was collected in lowland forest.

References

multicarinatus
Beetles of Indonesia
Endemic fauna of Indonesia
Fauna of Sulawesi
Beetles described in 1993